Salvador Calvo (born 1970) is a Spanish film and television director.

Biography 
Calvo was born 1970 in Madrid. He earned a licentiate degree in Information Sciences (Journalism) from the Complutense University of Madrid. Instead of focusing on a career in journalism, Calvo trained as director under the tutoring of Pilar Miró, Juan Carlos Corazza and Pilar Hermida.

He took part in several television series such as Sin tetas no hay paraíso (2007), Los misterios de Laura (2009), Niños robados (2012) and Las aventuras del capitán Alatriste (2013), as well as biopic miniseries such as La Duquesa, La Duquesa II, Paquirri (2009) and Mario Conde. Los días de gloria (2013).

His debut as director in a feature film came with the 2016 war drama 1898, Our Last Men in the Philippines, which earned him a nomination to the Goya Award for Best New Director. In March 2021, he won the Goya Award for Best Director for the 2020 drama film Adú.

Personal life 
As of 2021, Calvo is married to architech Juan Luis Arcos. They have one daughter.

Filmography 
Feature films
 1898: Los últimos de Filipinas (1898, Our Last Men in the Philippines) (2016)
 Adú (2020)
Short films
 Maras (2019)
TV miniseries
 Mario Conde. Los días de gloria (2013)
 Niños robados (2013)
 Hermanos (episodes 1–2, 5–6) (2014)
 Cuéntame un cuento (episode 4: "Hansel y Gretel") (2014)
 Lo que escondían sus ojos (2016)
 El padre de Caín (2016)

References

External links 
 

1970 births
Complutense University of Madrid alumni
Spanish film directors
Spanish television directors
Living people
Spanish LGBT artists
LGBT film directors
Spanish LGBT people